Harry Killick (13 July 1837 – 22 November 1877) was an English cricketer. Killick was a left-handed batsman who bowls right-arm roundarm medium. He was born at Crabtree, Sussex.

Killick made his first-class debut for Sussex against Surrey at The Oval in 1866. Killick played first-class cricket for Sussex to 1875, making a total of forty appearances, the last of which came against Hampshire at the County Ground, Hove. In his forty first-class appearances for the county, he scored 957 runs at an average of 14.07, with a high score of 78. This score was his only half century for Sussex and came against Surrey in 1869. With the ball, he took 6 wickets at a bowling average of 36.50, with best figures of 3/37.

In addition to playing first-class cricket for Sussex, Killick made first-class appearances for other teams. He made a single first-class appearance for a Left Handed team against a Right Handed at Lord's in 1870, a match in which he recorded his only other first-class half century with a score of 55. In that same year he made a single appearance for the Players of the South against the Gentlemen of the South at The Oval, as well as making his first appearance for a United South of England Eleven against a United North of England Eleven. He made a second appearance for the United South of England Eleven against Yorkshire in 1874. As well as playing the game, Killick also umpired it, standing in nineteen first-class matches from 1873 1877.

He died at Brighton, Sussex, on 22 November 1877. His nephew, Ernest Killick, also played first-class cricket.

References

External links
Harry Killick at ESPNcricinfo
Harry Killick at CricketArchive

1837 births
1877 deaths
People from Horsham District
English cricketers
Sussex cricketers
English cricket umpires
Players of the South cricketers
Left-Handed v Right-Handed cricketers
United South of England Eleven cricketers